Paul D. Ranger (born September 12, 1984) is a Canadian former professional ice hockey defenceman who is currently an assistant coach with the UOIT Ridgebacks.  He has spent the majority of his professional career with the Tampa Bay Lightning of the National Hockey League before leaving the sport at the professional level for almost three years due to severe depression. Ranger returned to professional hockey at the American Hockey League with the Toronto Marlies during the 2012–13 season, and subsequently signed a one-year contract with the Toronto Maple Leafs on July 24, 2013, to return to the NHL.

Playing career
Ranger played his junior career with the Oshawa Generals of the OHL.  After being drafted by the Tampa Bay Lightning 183rd overall in 2002, he played two more seasons with the Generals before signing with the Springfield Falcons of the AHL for the 2004–05 NHL lockout.  After the lockout, he played 76 games with the Lightning, scoring 18 points.

In October 2009, Ranger approached Lightning team personnel before practice and requested a leave of absence without pay, which the team agreed to.

During his time away from professional hockey, he attended the University of Ottawa and helped coached bantam hockey in his hometown, with help from David Branch, commissioner of the Ontario Hockey League. 
 
On August 21, 2012, after almost three seasons removed from competitive hockey, Ranger signed a minor league deal with the Toronto Marlies of the American Hockey League. His agent approached the team to inquire about his return to the NHL.  Even after his return, Ranger has declined to talk about the specific details about why he chose to return to professional hockey.  After a successful return to professional hockey with the Marlies, Ranger signed with the Toronto Maple Leafs for the 2013–14 season.

On July 15, 2014, after a single season with the Maple Leafs, Ranger opted to continue his career abroad, signing a two-year contract to help solidify the defense of Genève-Servette HC in the Swiss NLA. He played only 23 games in his first season with Geneva and was a healthy scratch for most of the 2014/15 season. He was released at the end of the season. He would join the Kloten Flyers for four games.

In 2018, he was the subject of "The Mystery of Paul Ranger", a documentary feature on TSN. The segment's creators, Matt Dorman, Darren Dreger, James Judges, Nigel Akam, Kevin Fallis and Darren Oliver, received a Canadian Screen Award nomination for Best Sports Feature Segment at the 7th Canadian Screen Awards.

Career statistics

References

External links

1984 births
Living people
Canadian ice hockey defencemen
Genève-Servette HC players
Ice hockey people from Ontario
EHC Kloten players
Oshawa Generals players
Springfield Falcons players
Sportspeople from Whitby, Ontario
Tampa Bay Lightning draft picks
Tampa Bay Lightning players
Toronto Maple Leafs players
Toronto Marlies players
Canadian expatriate ice hockey players in Switzerland